Antonino Neil Pappalardo is an American technology entrepreneur and the founder of MEDITECH, a supplier of information system software for hospitals headquartered in Massachusetts. Pappalardo co-founded MEDITECH in 1969, with the original name Medical Information Technology Inc. He was one of the original co-developers of the MUMPS programming language and system at Massachusetts General Hospital.

Early life 
Pappalardo is a native of Rochester, New York, born to Sicilian immigrant parents. He graduated in 1960 from McQuaid Jesuit High School and in 1964 received a Bachelor of Science degree in Physics and Electrical Engineering from the Massachusetts Institute of Technology (MIT) in Cambridge, Massachusetts. Pappalardo received a Honorary Doctorate degree from Suffolk University in 1996 and an Honorary Doctor of Engineering degree from the Korean Advanced Institute of Science and Technology (KAIST) in 2007.

Career

Early career 
Starting at age 13, he worked summers as a mason before getting a job at Bausch & Lomb designing circuits. Shortly after graduating with his B.S. in 1964, Pappalardo went to work at Massachusetts General Hospital in Boston, Massachusetts after meeting Dr. G. Octo Barnett, MD during his MIT thesis work. There, he worked in Barnett’s lab within the Laboratory of Computer Science on a “hospital computer project” in conjunction with Bolt Beranek and Newman, Inc (BBN), a research and computing consulting firm.

MUMPS 
The project at Massachusetts General Hospital would become the MGH Utility Multi-Programming System (MUMPS) and later the Meditech Interpretive Information System (MIIS), developed between 1964 and 1971. Papplardo is credited with co-development alongside Barnett, Robert Greenes, and Curt Marble.  The MUMPS programming language was supported with a grant from the National Center for Health Services Research and a contract from the National Institutes of Health (NIH).

MEDITECH 
Pappalardo cofounded MEDITECH (originally Medical Information Technology Inc.) in 1968 with Barnett, Marble, Morton Ruderman, and Jerome Grossman and opened for business in August 1969. The company’s first headquarters were located in East Cambridge, Massachusetts; they moved to Westwood, Massachusetts in 1983. Pappalardo served as CEO and President until 1994, when he became Chairman. , Pappalardo serves as Founder, Chairman, and Board Member.

Personal life 
Pappalardo lives in Boston, Massachusetts with his wife, Jane. They met during his senior year at MIT, and married in 1964. They have four children including Missy, born August 4, 1969, the same day that MEDITECH was launched.

Pappalardo is a life member emeritus of the MIT Corporation.

Since 1999, Pappalardo has supported physicists in MIT’s Department of Physics via a postdoctoral research fellowship, the Pappalardo Fellowships in Physics.

References

American chief executives
American health care chief executives
American technology chief executives
Living people
Year of birth missing (living people)
MIT Department of Physics alumni
Massachusetts Institute of Technology alumni
Businesspeople from Rochester, New York
 People from Rochester, New York